Salt Creek Township is a township in Davis County, Iowa, USA.  As of the 2000 census, its population was 294.

History
Salt Creek Township was organized in 1846. It took its name from Salt Creek.

Geography
Salt Creek Township covers an area of 35.9 square miles (92.98 square kilometers); of this, 0.29 square miles (0.76 square kilometers) or 0.82 percent is water. The stream of Salt Creek runs through this township.

Unincorporated towns
 Chequest
 White Elm
(This list is based on USGS data and may include former settlements.)

Adjacent townships
 Washington Township, Wapello County (north)
 Des Moines Township, Jefferson County (northeast)
 Village Township, Van Buren County (east)
 Chequest Township, Van Buren County (southeast)
 Union Township (south)
 Perry Township (southwest)
 Lick Creek Township (west)
 Keokuk Township, Wapello County (northwest)

Cemeteries
The township contains ten cemeteries: Anderson, Bethlehem, Glasgow, Heidlebaugh, Hem, Jackson, Litgner, Mount Gilead, Pagett and Pierce.

References
 U.S. Board on Geographic Names (GNIS)
 United States Census Bureau cartographic boundary files

External links
 US-Counties.com
 City-Data.com

Townships in Davis County, Iowa
Townships in Iowa